The Al Hurriya Liberal Network (AHLN) is a network of liberal political parties in the Middle East and North African region (MENA) founded on 20 March 2021.

Starting 2019, several liberal parties started cooperating to spread values such as human rights, democracy and the rule of law. The aim of the founding members is to unify and institutionalize relations between the MENA region liberal parties.

Governance 
 Vice-President: Mustapha Allouch, Future Movement

Members 
Five organisations are the founding members of AHLN.

References

Liberalism in the Arab world
Liberalism in the Middle East
2021 establishments